Installer VISE was an installer maker that supported Mac OS 9, Mac OS X, and Windows by MindVision Software.

Steve Kiene, the founder of MindVision, had done software work in the area of data compression, producing the Application VISE executable compressor for the Mac platform and a disk compression software implementation; the latter was released as Stacker after having been acquired by Stac Electronics. Installer VISE (which was first called Developer VISE) initially arose from some add-on software extensions that Kiene had developed for use with the Installer software from Apple.

Originally created Mac-only, Installer VISE was one of the most popular installer makers for the platform around 2006 given its visual interface that made the software easy to use by nontechnical persons in addition to its extensive features. However, its popularity has waned on Mac OS X. VISE X, an installer maker designed to produce installers specifically for installing Mac OS X software, was released by MindVision Software in 2003.

Quietly, without any press release, MindVision Software was acquired by Digital River in 2006. As of 2020, the software company seems to have closed down and the website is pointing to an e-commerce solution developed by Digital River, MyCommerce.

See also 
List of installation software

References

External links 
 

Installation software
Classic Mac OS software
Utilities for macOS
Utilities for Windows